Jo Sung-woo (Hangul: 조성우; born December 18, 1989), better known by his stage name Code Kunst (Hangul: 코드 쿤스트), is a South Korean composer and music producer. He joined HIGHGRND in 2015 and released his third studio album Muggle's Mansion in 2017. In 2018, he signed to AOMG and appeared as a judge alongside Paloalto on Show Me the Money 777. He released his fourth studio album People in 2020 and won Producer of the Year at the Korean Hip-hop Awards in 2021.

Early life and education 
Jo Sung-woo was born on December 18, 1989 in Songdo-dong, Incheon. He became interested in hip hop after listening to Nas' "Doo Rags". He decided to pursue a career in music after serving in the military. He studied design at Dong-ah Institute of Media and Arts, but got expelled.

The word "Kunst" means "Art" in German, so the stage name Code Kunst has a meaning of "the music I produced will become arts."

Career

2013-2017: Signing to Highgrnd 
In 2013, Code Kunst released his debut single "Lemonade", starting his music career relatively late in his life. Upon being asked whether he was nervous about his career in the beginning, he said, "At first, I wasn't nervous because in the beginning I was really going to do music as a hobby. I was already somewhat old and I didn't have the skills at first, but I felt that I needed to hurry. I'm too late, I'm too late... this thought was so strong. So I made the decision to spend the years I was 24 and 25 years old, 2 years--2 years, let me use that as if it were 4 years."

In April 2015, he released his second studio album Crumple, which was later nominated for Best Rap Album at the Korean Music Awards. In September 2015, Code Kunst joined the label HIGHGRND under YG Entertainment due to the impact of Tablo. He specifically cited Tablo's willingness to work together in person, such as on tracks like "Hood" featuring Tablo and Joey Bada$$, made him believe HIGHGRND was a good label for him.  He released his third album Muggles' Mansion in February 2017, which received critical acclaim.

2018-present: Signing to AOMG 
Code Kunst left HIGHGRND and joined AOMG in June 2018. In September 2018, he officially appeared in the Korean Hip-Hop survival show Show Me the Money 777 as one of the judges. "Good Day", a song he composed on the show, received positive reviews from critics. Loopy and Kid Milli from his team won second and third place in Show Me the Money 777.

In 2019, Code Kunst, along with Jay Park, Simon Dominic, Woo Won-jae, and Gray, appeared as judges on the audition program Signhere started by Korean Hip-hop label AOMG and MBN. In the same year, he appeared in another Hip-hop reality survival program High School Rapper 3. He was in the same team with The Quiett. Together they produced "Go High" (feat. Changmo, Woo Won-jae), sang by female rapper Lee Young-ji, who became the final winner to the show.

Code Kunst released his fourth studio album People in 2020. In the same year, he was announced as a producer for 'Show Me the Money 9' along with Paloalto as a team. In 2021, he won Producer of the Year at the Korean Hip-hop Awards. He then appeared as a winning producer for ‘Show Me the Money 10’ along with Gaeko of the rap group Dynamic Duo.

In 2023, he released his fifth studio album Remember Archive.

Artistry 
Code Kunst said that looking at his mother's paintings while growing up has greatly influenced and aided him in visualizing music. Additionally, in an interview-style conversation with fellow AOMG member punchnello, he has said that he draws musical inspiration from the simple and common experiences of everyday people which he also had before signing with larger labels (including "financially troubling situations and the kinds of things that happen in such situations"). As a result he thought signing with a label too early might hinder his ability to experience the things regular people go through in their mid-20s. For similar reasons, he had decided to name his 2017 album, "Muggles' Mansion." Specifically he has said that the world "muggles" has two meanings to him, one which means very common and one that does not. For the album he wanted to "tell common stories with sources that reflect myself, yet includes sounds which aren't so common."

He adds a lot of vocal chopping in his music which became one of his unique music styles. Rolling Stone India commented that "he takes deep dives into old-school blues, rock, soul and hip-hop, tying it all neatly together with his signature vocal chopping techniques and flawless loops of instrumentals."

He cited Mac Miller as his biggest influence.

Philanthropy 
In 2020, Code Kunst donated to the Official George Floyd Memorial Fund, claiming that black music made a big impact on his life.

Personal life 
Code Kunst has two cats named Panda and Seeroo.

Filmography

Television shows

Web shows

Music video appearances

Discography

Studio albums

Extended plays

Singles

Awards and nominations

References

External links
 Code Kunst on AOMG

1989 births
Living people
People from Incheon
South Korean record producers